Alfred Boyd  (June 23, 1898 – February 24, 1923) was an American baseball right fielder in the Negro leagues. He played for the Cleveland Tate Stars in 1921 and 1922.

References

External links
 and Baseball-Reference Black Baseball stats and Seamheads

Cleveland Tate Stars players
1898 births
1923 deaths
20th-century African-American sportspeople
Baseball outfielders